Abdullah Mohammed Al-Sudairy (born 2 February 1992) is a Saudi footballer who plays as a goalkeeper.

Club career
He joined Al-Hilal in 2010 where he made one appearance in that season.

References

External links
 

1992 births
Living people
Association football goalkeepers
2015 AFC Asian Cup players
Saudi Arabian footballers
Saudi Arabia international footballers
Al Hilal SFC players
Al-Wehda Club (Mecca) players
Al-Shabab FC (Riyadh) players
Al-Taqadom FC players
Saudi Arabia youth international footballers
Saudi First Division League players
Saudi Professional League players